The kissar (also spelled kissir), tanbour or gytarah barbaryeh is the traditional Nubian lyre, still in use in Egypt, Sudan and Abyssinia. 
It consists of a body having instead of the traditional tortoise-shell back, a shallow, round bowl of wood, covered with a soundboard of sheepskin, in which are two small round sound-holes. The arms, set through the soundboard at points distant about the third of the diameter from the circumference, have the familiar fan shape. Five gut strings, knotted round the bar and raised from the soundboard by means of a bridge tailpiece similar to that in use on the modern guitar, are plucked by means of a plectrum by the right hand for the melody, while the left hand sometimes twangs some of the strings as a soft drone accompaniment.

The kissar has been a popular  instrument in northern Sudan in Nubian and Shaigiya music, but also among the Nuba and Beja people.

See also 
 Krar
 Tanbura

References

 

Nubia
Lyres
Ethiopian musical instruments
Egyptian musical instruments
Sudanese musical instruments